Lynton Fitzpatrick (born 17 January 1967) is a former Australian rules footballer who played with Footscray in the Victorian Football League (VFL).

Fitzpatrick, recruited locally from Footscray District Football League team Deer Park, was a defender. He made 18 senior appearances for Footscray, from 1987 to 1989. Geelong secured him in the 1990 Pre-Season Draft but he didn't play a league game for the club. He went on to have a noted career with Werribee in the Victorian Football Association (later Victorian Football League). A member of Werribee's 1993 premiership team, Fitzpatrick won the club's best and fairest award in 1995 and was captain for the next two seasons.

References

1967 births
Australian rules footballers from Victoria (Australia)
Western Bulldogs players
Werribee Football Club players
Living people